Dieter Förstl is a former slalom canoeist who competed for West Germany in the 1970s. He won two medals at the ICF Canoe Slalom World Championships with a gold (K-1 team: 1975) and a silver (K-1: 1977).

References

German male canoeists
Possibly living people
Year of birth missing (living people)
Medalists at the ICF Canoe Slalom World Championships